Eulimastoma engonium, common name the needle odostome,  is a species of sea snail, a marine gastropod mollusk in the family Pyramidellidae, the pyrams and their allies.

Description
The shell is white and lustrous. Its length measures 6.5 mm. The seven whorls of the teleoconch are flattened, distinctly chamfered above the channeled suture. The body whorl is distinctly angulated at the periphery, where there is a prominent rounded thread. There are also numerous indistinct, unequal striae only visible under a microscope. The columella has a small distinct fold, not
seen in a front view.

Distribution
This species occurs in the following locations:
 Caribbean Sea
 Colombia
 Gulf of Mexico
 Cape Hatteras, North Carolina, USA

References

External links
 To Encyclopedia of Life
 To ITIS
 To World Register of Marine Species

Pyramidellidae
Gastropods described in 1885